Knockmealdown (meaning 'hill of Maoldomhnach') is the highest peak of the Knockmealdown Range of mountains, located on the border between Co Tipperary and Co Waterford.

Geography
The peak itself is located in County Waterford and is the highest point in that county. However, since the county border generally follows the summit line the main peaks are actually in both county Tipperary and in County Waterford (OSI Discovery Map 75).

Name
Knockmealdown is the Anglicised form of an older Irish name. The original Irish name is widely believed to be Cnoc Mhaoldomhnaigh, meaning "Muldowneys' hill". It has also been suggested that it is derived from Cnoc Maol Donn, meaning "bald brown hill". In 1654 the name was recorded as Knockmealdowny, indicating there was an extra syllable at the end.

Hill walking 
The peak is easily accessed from the west, via the layby overlooking Bay Lough on the Vee Gap. This involves first climbing Sugarloaf Hill. It may also be climbed by following the Glannandaree stream from the carpark at the point where the R668 and R669 roads meet.

See also
Lists of mountains in Ireland
List of Irish counties by highest point
List of mountains of the British Isles by height
List of P600 mountains in the British Isles
List of Marilyns in the British Isles
List of Hewitt mountains in England, Wales and Ireland

References

Marilyns of Ireland
Hewitts of Ireland
Mountains and hills of County Waterford
Highest points of Irish counties
Mountains under 1000 metres